Sir Richard Blake was an Irish politician and Mayor of Galway, fl. 1627-1648.

Blake was the son of Richard Blake of Ardfry, near Oranmore, County Galway. 

Sir Richard was Mayor of Galway for the term 1627-28 and from 1639 to 1649 elected to sit for County Galway in the Parliament of Ireland. In 1648 he was elected Speaker or Chairman, of the assembly of the Irish Confederation at Kilkenny.

He supported the Ormonde peace treaties. Both he and his cousin, Sir Valentine Blake, 3rd Baronet, were captured by the soldiers of Owen Roe O'Neill in June, 1648 but were released unharmed.

His descendants included Baron Wallscourt and Michael Blake.

References

 Roll of Honour:The Mayors of Galway, William Henry, Galway, 2002.

Politicians from County Galway
Mayors of Galway
17th-century Irish businesspeople
People of the Irish Confederate Wars
Irish MPs 1639–1649
Members of the Parliament of Ireland (pre-1801) for County Galway constituencies